Louis the German (c. 806/810 – 28 August 876), also known as Louis II of Germany and Louis II of East Francia, was the first king of East Francia, and ruled from 843 to 876 AD. Grandson of emperor Charlemagne and the third son of Louis the Pious, emperor of Francia, and his first wife, Ermengarde of Hesbaye, he received the appellation Germanicus shortly after his death, when East Francia became known as the kingdom of Germany.  

After protracted clashes with his father and his brothers, Louis received the East Frankish kingdom in the Treaty of Verdun (843). His attempts to conquer his half-brother Charles the Bald's West Frankish kingdom in 858–59 were unsuccessful. The 860s were marked by a severe crisis, with the East Frankish rebellions of the sons, as well as struggles to maintain supremacy over his realm. In the Treaty of Meerssen he acquired Lotharingia for the East Frankish kingdom in 870. On the other hand, he tried and failed to claim both the title of Emperor and Italy. In the East, Louis was able to reach a longer-term peace agreement in 874 after decades of conflict with the Moravians. His rule shows a marked decline in creation of written administration and government documents, a trend that would continue into Ottonian times.

Early life
His early years were partly spent at the court of his grandfather, Charlemagne, whose special affection he is said to have won. When the emperor Louis the Pious divided his dominions between his sons in 817, Louis was made the ruler of the Duchy of Bavaria, following the practice of emperor Charlemagne of bestowing a local kingdom to a close family member who then would serve as his lieutenant and local governor. Louis ruled from Regensburg, the old capital of the Bavarii. In 825 he became involved in wars with the Wends and Sorbs on his eastern frontier. In 827, he married Hemma, sister of his stepmother Judith of Bavaria, both daughters of Welf, whose possessions ranged from Alsace to Bavaria.

It was not until 826 that Louis first came to rule Bavaria. In 828 and 829 he undertook two campaigns against the Bulgarians who wanted to penetrate into Pannonia without great success. During his time as Unterkönig, he tried to extend his rule to the Rhine-Main area.

Rebellious son
His involvement in the first civil war against his father's reign was limited, but in the second his elder brothers, Lothair I, then King of Italy, and Pepin I, Duke of Aquitaine, persuaded him to invade Alamannia which their father had given to their young half-brother Charles the Bald, by promising to give him the land in the new partition they would make after a victory. In 832 he led an army of Slavs into Alamannia, but was driven back by his father. Louis the Pious disinherited him, but to no effect; the emperor was soon captured by his own rebellious sons and deposed. Upon his swift reinstatement, however, the emperor Louis made peace with his son Louis and legally restored Bavaria (never actually lost) to him in 836.

Louis was the instigator of the third civil war, which began in 839. A strip of his land having been given to the young half-brother Charles, Louis invaded Alamannia again. This time emperor Louis responded quickly, and soon the younger Louis was forced into the far southeastern corner of his realm, the March of Pannonia. Peace was then made by force of arms.

Civil war and aftermath, 840–844

When the emperor Louis died in 840, and Lothair I claimed the whole Empire, Louis allied with Charles the Bald, and defeated Lothair I and their nephew Pepin II of Aquitaine, son of Pepin I of Aquitaine, at the Battle of Fontenoy in June 841. Both sides suffered heavy casualties. According to the Annals of Fulda, it was the biggest bloodbath the Franks had experienced since time immemorial. At the same time, it was Louis's last battle in the struggle for the unification of the kingdom.

In June 842 the three brothers met on an island in the river Saône to negotiate a peace and each appointed forty representatives to arrange the boundaries of their respective kingdoms. This developed into the Treaty of Verdun, concluded by 10 August 843, by which Louis received the bulk of the lands lying east of the Rhine (East Francia), together with a district around Speyer, Worms, and Mainz, on the left bank of the river (see also Oaths of Strasbourg 842). His territories included Bavaria (where he made Regensburg the centre of his government), Thuringia, Franconia, and Saxony.

Louis may be called the founder of the German kingdom, though his attempts to maintain the unity of the Empire proved futile. Having in 842 crushed the Stellinga rising in Saxony, in 844 he compelled the Obotrites to accept his authority and put their prince, Gozzmovil, to death. Thachulf, Duke of Thuringia, then undertook campaigns against the Bohemians, Moravians, and other tribes, but was not very successful in resisting the ravaging Vikings.

Conflicts with Charles the Bald

In 852 Louis sent his son Louis the Younger to Aquitaine, where nobles had grown resentful of Charles the Bald's rule. The younger Louis did not set out until 854, and returned the following year.

Starting from 853 Louis made repeated attempts to gain the throne of West Francia, which, according to the Annals of Fulda (Annales Fuldenses), the people of that country offered him in their disgust with the cruel misrule of Charles the Bald. Encouraged by his nephews Peppin II and Charles of Provence, Louis invaded in West Francia in 858. Charles the Bald could not even raise an army to resist the invasion and fled to Burgundy. Later that year Louis issued a charter dated "the first year of the reign in West Francia." However, treachery and desertion in his army, and the continued loyalty of the Aquitanian bishops to Charles the Bald, brought about the failure of the whole enterprise. As such on 7 June 860 at Koblenz, both Louis and Charles made public vows to uphold the peace.

After the emperor Lothair I died in 855, Louis and Charles for a time cooperated in plans to divide Lothair's possessions between themselves, the only impediments to this being Lothair's sons and heirs—Lothair II (who received Lotharingia), Louis II of Italy (who held the imperial title and the Iron Crown of Lombardy) and Charles of Provence. In 868 at Metz Louis and Charles agreed to partition Lotharingia. When Lothair II died in 869, Louis was lying seriously ill, and his armies were engaged in a war with the Moravians. Charles the Bald quickly seized Lothair's lands, but Louis, having recovered, compelled him by threat of war to agree to the Treaty of Meerssen, which divided Lothair's lands among all the claimants.

Divisio regni among the sons

The later years of Louis the German were troubled by rebellions of his sons. The eldest, Carloman of Bavaria, revolted in 861 and again two years later. This was followed by the second son Louis the Younger, who was joined by his brother Charles the Fat. In 864 Louis was forced to grant Carloman the kingdom of Bavaria, which he himself had once held under his father. In 865 he divided the remainder of his lands—Saxony with Franconia and Thuringia went to Louis the Younger and Swabia with Raetia to Charles the Fat.

In May 868, Louis convoked a synod at Worms to deal with the aftermath of the Photian schism and to get the church's support against Moravia.

A report that the Emperor Louis II had died in Italy led to a peace between father and sons and attempts by Louis the German to gain the imperial crown for his oldest son Carloman. These efforts were thwarted by Louis II, who was in fact not dead, and Louis' old adversary, Charles the Bald.

Later life

In the years 872 and 873, ambassadors of the Eastern Roman Emperor Basil I came to Louis in Regensburg and showed that his rule was perceived as far as Constantinople. After the death of Emperor Louis II in August 875, Louis tried to win the emperorship for himself and his descendants. For this purpose, Abbot Sigihard von Fulda undertook a trip to Rome to Pope John VIII. On 18 May 876 he returned to Ingelheim and reported to Louis that, in December 875, Charles the Bald had been able to obtain the title of emperor by a swift move to Rome.

His wife Hemma visited Louis for the last time in May 875. In 874 she had lost her voice as a result of a stroke. During his stay, he donated the Berg im Donaugau Abbey to the Marienkapelle, which he built. Hemma died at the end of January 876 in Regensburg. Louis then died after a short illness on 28 August 876 in his palace in Frankfurt. The following day he was buried by his son Louis in Lorsch Abbey. However, according to Wilfried Hartmann, it cannot be determined with certainty whether the dead man in his sarcophagus is the Carolingian king. After Louis' death, Charles the Bald tried to win over the Eastern kingdom as well. However, Louis the Younger defeated him on 8 October 876 at Andernach with a squad of Franks, Saxons and Thuringians. One year later, Charles the Bald died as well.

Louis' Rule

As there exist only 172 royal documents from 50 years of reign, it is impossible to create a detailed picture of Louis' whereabouts in the East Frankish kingdom. By comparison, Louis the Pious had 18 certificates created per year, and his half-brother Charles the Bald had 12 produced annually. This pattern of not producing many documents lasts for several months at certain times. For example, it is completely uncertain where the East Frankish king stayed between June 849 and July 850. At least 52 documents are addressed to Bavarian beneficiaries. However, the intensity of the documentary production for Bavarian recipients steadily decreased during his reign.

As former stem duchy, the Rhine-Main area contained Frankfurt, Mainz and Worms, and had plenty of Imperial Palaces and treasuries. Since it was located in the geographic centre of the East Frankish kingdom, it was easily accessible by road. As a result, it was the region in which most East Frankish synods and imperial assemblies were hosted.

Nickname "the German"

Louis was only nicknamed "the German" in the 18th century. Contemporary West Frankish sources called Louis rex Germaniae ("King of Germania") or rex Germanorum ("King of the Teutons"). However, in this context, Germania or Germani does not mean "Germany" or "the Germans", but, as in ancient Latin, the area on the right bank of the Rhine outside the former Roman Empire and its inhabitants. Contemporaries gave Louis the epithet pius (pious) or piissimus (very pious). The contemporary coinage called him HLUDOVICUS PIUS REX.

Marriage and children
Louis was married to Hemma (died 31 January 876), and they had:
Hildegard (828–856)
Carloman of Bavaria (829–880), King of Bavaria
Irmgard of Chiemsee also known as Ermengard (died 866) (Louis, having established two of his other daughters as abbesses of convents, appointed Irmgard (also known as Ermengard) to govern first the monastery of Buchau and then the royal abbey of Chiemsee in Bavaria. She is commemorated as a saint on 17 July.)
Gisela, possibly died in childhood
Louis the Younger (835–882)
Bertha (died 877)
Charles the Fat (839–888)

Notes

References

Bibliography

External links 

 
 Publications on Louis the German in the Opac of the Regesta Imperii
 Deed by Louis the German for St. Emmeram Abbey in Regensburg, 18 August 831, 

|-

|-

|-

9th-century births
876 deaths
Year of birth uncertain
9th-century kings of East Francia
9th-century dukes of Bavaria
Frankish warriors
Kings of Bavaria
Dukes of Maine
Burials at Lorsch Abbey
Rebellious princes
Sons of emperors